Mount Sir Douglas is located on the border of Alberta and British Columbia on the Continental Divide, at the northern end of Height of the Rockies Provincial Park and east of Invermere. It is Alberta's 18th highest peak, and 28th prominence mountain as well as British Columbia's 28th highest peak. It was named in 1916 by interprovincial boundary surveyors after Field Marshal Sir Douglas Haig.

Geology
Mount Sir Douglas is composed of sedimentary rock laid down during the Precambrian to Jurassic periods. Formed in shallow seas, this sedimentary rock was pushed east and over the top of younger rock during the Laramide orogeny.

Climate
Based on the Köppen climate classification, Mount Sir Douglas is located in a subarctic climate zone with cold, snowy winters, and mild summers. Temperatures can drop below −20 C with wind chill factors below −30 C.

See also
 List of peaks on the British Columbia–Alberta border

References

External links
 Mount Sir Douglas weather site: Mountain Forecast

Three-thousanders of Alberta
Three-thousanders of British Columbia
Canadian Rockies
Mountains of Banff National Park